The Halesowen Railway, also known as the Halesowen and Northfield Railway and the Halesowen Joint Railway, was a standard gauge railway in what is now the West Midlands of England.  It connected the Great Western Railway's branch from Old Hill to Halesowen (opened 1878) with the Midland Railway’s Birmingham to Gloucester line at Longbridge Junction (formerly known as Halesowen Junction) near the present Longbridge station. The term "Halesowen Railway" is sometimes applied to the whole line between Old Hill and Longbridge but, strictly, it applies only to the portion south of Halesowen.

Opening
Construction of the line between Halesowen and  started in 1878 and the railway opened as the Halesowen and Northfield Railway on 10 September 1883. It later became the Halesowen Joint Railway - a joint operation between the Great Western and Midland Railways. It became jointly owned by the GWR and the London Midland & Scottish Railway in 1923 and British Railways in 1948.

Closure
It had a relatively short passenger railway life, the stations on the line being closed in 1919. There were freight trains and workers' special services to the Austin Rover Works up to 1960.

The line was closed altogether in 1964. The former station at Hunnington has been converted into a house and the other intermediate station at Rubery has been demolished. A short section of the line remained at the southern end to serve the Longbridge motor plant although there was no traffic after 2005 and that section was lifted during the redevelopment of the Longbridge site subsequent to its closure.

Campaign for Better Transport have added the railway to their recommendations for reopening.

Structures
A significant structure on the line was the Dowery Dell Viaduct, between Halesowen and Rubery. It was dismantled in 1964.

References

External links

 Map of railways around Birmingham
 Midland Railway diagram of Halesowen Junction

British joint railway companies
Closed railway lines in the West Midlands (region)
Rail transport in the West Midlands (county)